The Fontenoy was a 90-gun Suffren-class Ship of the line of the French Navy. She was the only in French service named in honour of Battle of Fontenoy.

Career 
She was part of the Toulons quadron until 1871, when she was converted into a prison hulk for prisoners of the Paris Commune.

In 1878, her engines were removed and she became a transport. Her name changed to Bretagne and she was used as a boys' school ship for the École des mousses.

She was eventually decommissioned in 1892 and broken up in 1911.

Notes, citations, and references

Notes

Citations

References

 90-guns ships-of-the-line

Ships of the line of the French Navy
Ships built in France
1858 ships
Crimean War naval ships of France
Suffren-class ships of the line